...And Oceans, at one time known as Havoc Unit, is a metal band from Finland. It was formed in 1989 as a death metal outfit called Festerday, but soon changed its style to symphonic black metal. It released its first album as ...and Oceans in 1998, and in the following years it pursued a less traditional, more industrial-oriented direction.

History
The band was formed in 1989 as Festerday and it originally played death metal. It changed name to ...and Oceans in 1995, and the band's debut release was the symphonic black metal album  Dynamic Gallery of Thoughts, released by Season of Mist. The Symmetry of I – The Circle of O followed in 1998. The band signed to Century Media, who issued the A.M. G.O.D.: Allotropic/Metamorphic Genesis of Dimorphism album, described by AllMusic as "definitely one of the band's finest", and the band's profile was raised by a European tour with Marduk, Vader, and Mortician. The band's 2002 album Cypher was described by Allmusic as "Scandinavian cyber-metal", "sounding as if Skinny Puppy and Cannibal Corpse have spawned some kind of terrible, shrieking cyborg baby". Band members also played in Rotten Sound, Deathbound, and 6 Billion Ways to Die.

Havoc Unit
After ten years of existence as ...and Oceans and four full-length albums, the band changed its name to Havoc Unit in 2005. Its first album under the new name was h.IV+ (Hoarse Industrial Viremia), released in 2008. After five years, in 2013 band's name returned to be Festerday.

Return as ...And Oceans
On  January 14, 2020, heavy metal label Season of Mist announced the upcoming release of Cosmic World Mother, a new album from the band, now reformed as ...And Oceans. 

In October 2022, the band announced their upcoming album, As in Gardens, So in Tombs, would be released on January 27, 2023.

Members
 Jos.f (Kena Strömsholm) – vocals 
 T.kunz (Timo Kontio) – guitar , bass guitar 
 Heinr.ich (Mika Aalto) – keyboards 
 Sa.myel (Sami Latva) – drums, bass, guitar

Former members
…And Oceans
 de Monde "7Even II" (Teemu Saari) – guitar 
 Martex "Cauldron, Grief, Mr. Plaster" (Jani Martikkala) – drums 
 Mr. Oos – bass 
 Anti "Anzaar" – keyboards 
 Pete (Petri Seikkula) – guitar 
 Jallu – bass
 Piia – keyboards, violin

Festerday
 Teemu Kilponen – drums 
 Jakke Mäki – bass 
 Jari Honkaniemi – bass 
 Miikka Timonen – drums 
 Veijo Pulkkinen – drums 

Timeline

Discography

As Festerday (1989–1992; since 2013)

 Festerday / Carnifex (split with Carnifex, 1991)
 Demo II (demo, 1991)
 Demo III (demo, 1992)
 Iihtallan (album, 2019)

As ...And Oceans (1995–2023)
 Wave (demo, 1995)
 Promo Tape (demo, 1996)
 Mare Liberum (demo, 1997)
 The Dynamic Gallery of Thoughts (1998)
 War Vol. I (split with Bloodthorn, 1998)
 The Symmetry of I - The Circle of O (1999)
 ...and Oceans (box set, 2000)
 mOrphogenesis (EP) (2001)
 A.M.G.O.D. (Allotropic/Metamorphic Genesis of Dimorphism) (2001)
 Cypher (2002)
 The Dynamic Gallery of Thoughts / The Symmetry of I – The Circle of O (compilation, 2003)
 Cosmic World Mother (2020)
 As in Gardens, So in Tombs (2023)

As Havoc Unit (2005-2013)
 Havoc Unit / And Then You Die (split with And Then You Die, 2007)
 Synæsthesia - The Requiem Reveries (2007)
 Havoc Unit / ...and Oceans (2007)
 h.IV+ (Hoarse Industrial Viremia)  (2007)

References

External links

Musical groups established in 1989
Finnish black metal musical groups
Industrial metal musical groups
Symphonic black metal musical groups
Post-metal musical groups
Musical quartets
Season of Mist artists
Musical groups from Helsinki